The 2011 Wan Chai District Council election was held on 6 November 2011 to elect all 11 elected members to the 13-member District Council.

The pro-Beijing camp remained control of the council with the Democratic Alliance for the Betterment and Progress of Hong Kong retained the largest party status with three seats. In Broadwood, incumbent Michael Mak Kwok-fung of the pro-democracy League of Social Democrats lost to independent Pamela Peck Wan-kam.

Overall election results
Before election:

Change in composition:

Results by constituency

Broadwood

Canal Road

Causeway Bay

Happy Valley

Hennessy

Jardine's Lookout

Oi Kwan

Southorn

Stubbs Road

Tai Fat Hau

Tai Hang

References

2011 Hong Kong local elections
Wan Chai District Council elections